Jackson National Fish Hatchery is a National fish hatchery in Jackson, Wyoming.  The hatchery is run by the U.S. Fish and Wildlife Service.   The hatchery is physically located on the National Elk Refuge, a protected feeding ground for elk that winter in the Jackson Hole valley.  The fish hatchery produces fish for a  distribution area in Wyoming and Idaho.

Species 

The Jackson National Fish Hatchery rears one species of fish: the Snake River fine-spotted cutthroat trout (Oncoryhnchus clarki behnkei).

See also 
 List of National Fish Hatcheries in the United States
 Saratoga National Fish Hatchery

References

External links 
 

National Fish Hatcheries of the United States
Landmarks in Wyoming
Tourist attractions in Teton County, Wyoming
Buildings and structures in Jackson, Wyoming
Agricultural buildings and structures in Wyoming